Lucien Henry Reeberg (February 21, 1942 – January 31, 1964) was an American football offensive tackle who played one season with the Detroit Lions of the National Football League. He was drafted by the Detroit Lions in the 19th round of the 1963 NFL Draft. He played college football at Hampton University. Reeberg died of heart failure due to uremic poisoning on January 31, 1964.

References

External links
Just Sports Stats

1942 births
1964 deaths
American football offensive tackles
African-American players of American football
Hampton Pirates football players
Detroit Lions players
Sportspeople from the Bronx
Players of American football from New York City
20th-century African-American sportspeople